Clifton is a surname.

People
Clifton (1817 cricketer), English cricketer
Allie Clifton (born 1988), American journalist
Bernie Clifton (born 1936), British comedian
Bill Clifton (born 1931), American musician
Brian Clifton (1934–2020), English footballer who played for Southampton and Grimsby Town
Chad Clifton (born 1976), offensive lineman for the Green Bay Packers football team
Chas S. Clifton (born 1951), American academic
Chester Victor Clifton Jr. (1913–1991), Major General in the United States Army
Clifford Clifton (1626–1670), English landowner and politician
Connor Clifton (born 1995), American ice hockey player
Donald O. Clifton (1924–2003), American psychologist
Elmer Clifton (1890–1949), American writer and actor
Flea Clifton (1909–1997), American baseball player
Gervase Clifton, 1st Baron Clifton (1579–1618), of Barrington Court, Somerset
Sir Gervase Clifton, 1st Baronet, (1587–1666), of Nottinghamshire
Sir Gervase Clifton, 2nd Baronet, (1612–1675), of Nottinghamshire
Harry Clifton (disambiguation)
Helen Clifton (1948–2011), wife of the 18th General of the Salvation Army
Jane Clifton (born 1949), Australian actor
Jim Clifton, American businessman
Joanne Clifton (born 1983), English dancer
John Clifton (disambiguation)
Joseph C. Clifton (1905–1967), American naval officer
Kevin Clifton (born 1982), English dancer
Kyle Clifton (born 1962), American footballer
Maddie Clifton (1990–1998), American murder victim
Mark Clifton (1906–1963), American author and businessman
Nathaniel Clifton (1922–1990), American athlete
Pete Clifton (born 1962), head of BBC News Interactive
Peter Clifton (1941–2018), Australian director and producer
Phil Clifton (born 1988), British television and radio presenter
Richard Clifton (born 1950), American judge
Scott Clifton (born 1987), American musician and actor
Shaw Clifton (born 1945), 18th General of the Salvation Army
Steve Clifton (born 1987), Australian rules football player
John Talbot Clifton (1868–1928), English traveller and landowner
Violet Clifton (1883–1961), English traveller
Sir William Clifton, 3rd Baronet, (1663–1686), of Nottinghamshire

Fictional
Tony Clifton, fictional character created by Andy Kaufman
Pat Clifton, protagonist of Postman Pat
Leon Clifton, a fictional American detective from Czech pulp fiction

See also
Geoffrey Benedict Clifton-Brown (1899–1983), British Conservative Party politician
Sir Geoffrey Robert Clifton-Brown (born 1953), British politician and farmer
Richard Clifton-Dey (1930–1997), British illustrator

English toponymic surnames